Siva Rama Raju is a 2002 Indian Telugu-language action drama film, produced by R. B. Choudary under Super Good Films and directed by V. Samudra and. It stars Nandamuri Harikrishna, Jagapathi Babu, Venkat, Sivaji, Monica  and music composed by S. A. Rajkumar. The film was a remake of the Tamil film Samudhiram (2000), with flashback sub-plot borrowed from another Tamil film Simmarasi (1998) - a pattern later followed in the 2014 Kannada remake of this film Paramashiva.

Plot
The film begins in a village where 3 siblings Sivaramaraju, Rama Raju, and Raju belong to the royal dynasty are forefronts and inseparably joined to kinship. The set of three dotes on their adorable little sister Swati and prepared everything for her bliss. They owe that three of them will wedlock in her sight. Firstly, Swati fixes a match for Sivaramaraju with a benignant Rajeswari. Every year, it is customary for their clan members to decorate the goddess of the village with garland and dance in front of the temple. On that occasion, Nagendra Varma Zamindar of the adjacent village attends with his son Aakash to offer the gold to the goddess as a solemn promise. But they are stopped until the arrival of Sivaramaraju. Then, Aakash uses force when Ramaraju mishandles with him. Being Narendra Varma is affronted, he ploys by knitting Swati with Aakash and crafty demands for their entire wealth which they cheerfully gave up. Afterward, they shift to a little cottage and make cultivation their livelihood. At this stage, Swati restricts her brothers' visits to keep them away from ignominy.

Meanwhile, Rajeswari's father breaks the alliance as Sivaramaraju is bankrupted. However, Rajeswari omits her father and proceeds for Sivaramaraju. Accordingly, he marries her at Swati's residence where Sivaramaraju faces the music, but he thresholds it with patience. Time being, Swati conceives, yet she is subjected to bedevilment by her in-laws. Ramaraju nuptials his cousin Janaki which Sivaramaraju smartly carries out before Swathi. Soon after, vainglory Janaki hostiles the joint family and swears to exact their happiness. However, the kin confronts it through their idolization when Janaki also realizes her mistake. Parallelly, Raju falls for his collegian Rani daughter of an MP. Therein, Rani's brother Madan hits Raju hard and Sivaramaraju retaliates against him. Knowing it, MP moves on to wipe out the household. But shockingly, he bows down before the photograph of Sivaramarajus's father Ananda Bhupathi Raju and drives rearward.

25 years ago, Ananda Bhupathi is an arbiter who is esteemed as a deity. In his reign, that area is eternal from four sides. At that time, MP is his subordinate and he triumphed with his support. Once, Ananda Bhupathi verdicts and fastens Zamindar Veeraraju's daughter Rajyalakshmi with her love interest Ramakrishna that belongs to a lower tier. Hence, fumed vicious Veeraraju conspires to kill the pair, eventually, they are safeguarded by Ananda Bhupathi. Since Veeraraju is unable to beat Ananda Bhupathi, he connives through genuflect. On the eve of the festival, Ananda Bhupati has a vow that he vouchsafes anything to one who prays before him. Herein, Veeraraju slyly implores for his head which he bestows him without any hesitation endorsing his authority and younger responsibility to infant Sivaramaraju. The sacred sacrifice of Ananda Bhupathi changed Veeraraju too and is immortalized in history.

Presently, MP accepts the espousal as a boon. During the time of the wedding, Swati is forbidden and tormented by Aakash. By means, Sivaramarajus go there and they are battered by showing endanger to Swati. Whereat, furious Swati revolts, ends her relationship with Aakash by removing the wedding chain (Mangalasutram), and quits with her brothers. At last, Swati gives birth to a baby boy when Aakash and Narendra Varma reform and plead pardon. The movie ends on a happy note with the reunion of the family.

Cast

 Jagapati Babu as Siva Rama Raju
 Nandamuri Harikrishna as Ananda Bhupathi Raju
 Venkat as Rama Raju 
 Sivaji as Raju
 Monica as Swathi
 Poonam Singar as Rajeswari
 Laya as Janaki 
 Kanchi Kaul as Rani
 Pyramid Natarajan as Narendra Varma
 Anand Raj as Veeraju Varma 
 Bramhanandam as Puliraju
 Dharmavarapu Subramanyam as Lecturer
 L.B. Sriram as Srisailam
 Rami Reddy as Rajeswari's father
 Kaushal Manda
 Tirupathi Prakash
 Dasari Arun Kumar in a special appearance in the song "Nirupedala Devudivaiah"
 Shiju as Swathi's husband
 Raghunatha Reddy
 Vizag Prasad as M.P
 Chittajalu Lakshmipati as Servant
 Gadiraju Subba Rao 
 Chandra Mouli
 KK Sharma as Achari 
 Madhu as Goon
 Varun as Ramakrishna
 Junior Relangi as Doctor
 Satyapriya as Sivaramaraju's aunt
 Sana as Veeraju's wife
 Varsha as Rajyalakshmi
 Madhavi Sri
 Suman Sri

Soundtrack

Music composed by S. A. Rajkumar. Lyrics written by Chirravuri Vijay Kumar.  Music released on Aditya Music Company. The song "Ding Ding" was reused as "Kannum Kannum Paathukitta" in Sundara Travels. The song "Azhagana Chinna Devathai" from the original Tamil film Samuthiram was retained here as "Andala Chinni".

References

External links
 

2002 films
Telugu remakes of Tamil films
2000s Telugu-language films
Films scored by S. A. Rajkumar
Films directed by V. Samudra
Indian drama films
2002 drama films
Super Good Films films